Novopokrovka is the name of several inhabited localities in Ukraine:

Urban localities
Novopokrovka, Dnipropetrovsk Oblast, an urban-type settlement in Dnipropetrovsk Oblast
Novopokrovka, Kharkiv Oblast, an urban-type settlement in Kharkiv Oblast

Rural localities
Novopokrovka, Kirovske Raion, Crimea, a village in Kirovske Raion
Novopokrovka, Krasnohvardiiske Raion, Crimea, a village in Krasnohvardiiske Raion
Novopokrovka, Kryvyi Rih Raion, Dnipropetrovsk Oblast, a village in Kryvyi Rih Raion
Novopokrovka, Lozova Raion, Kharkiv Oblast, a village in Lozova Raion
Novopokrovka, Kherson Oblast, a village in Henichesk Raion
Novopokorvka, Kirovohrad Oblast, a village in Kropyvnytskyi Raion
Novopokrovka, Luhansk Oblast, a village in Svatove Raion
Novopokrovka, Odessa Oblast, a village in Berezivka Raion
Novopokrovka, Melitopol Raion, Zaporizhzhia Oblast, a village in Melitopol Raion
Novopokrovka, Polohy Raion, Zaporizhzhia Oblast, a village in Polohy Raion